Cobue is a small lake-side town in Niassa Province, in north-west Mozambique. It is located on the shore of Lake Niassa.

References

External links
Flickr image of the burned church

Populated places in Niassa Province